Marlene Fuchs (born 31 March 1942) is a German athlete. She competed in the women's shot put at the 1968 Summer Olympics.

References

1942 births
Living people
Athletes (track and field) at the 1968 Summer Olympics
German female shot putters
Olympic athletes of West Germany
Place of birth missing (living people)